The 1988 NAIA Division I football season was the 33rd season of college football sponsored by the NAIA, was the 19th season of play of the NAIA's top division for football.

The season was played from August to November 1988 and culminated in the 1988 NAIA Champion Bowl playoffs and the 1988 NAIA Champion Bowl, played this year on December 17, 1988 at Burke–Tarr Stadium in Jefferson City, Tennessee, on the campus of Carson–Newman College.

Carson–Newman defeated Adams State in the Champion Bowl, 56–21, to win their fourth NAIA national title. It was the Eagles' third straight appearance in the Champion Bowl, going 1–1 in the previous two.

Conference standings

Conference champions

Postseason

See also
 1988 NAIA Division II football season
 1988 NCAA Division I-A football season
 1988 NCAA Division I-AA football season
 1988 NCAA Division II football season
 1988 NCAA Division III football season

References

 
NAIA Football National Championship